A dendrogram is a diagram representing a tree. This diagrammatic representation is frequently used in different contexts:
 in hierarchical clustering, it illustrates the arrangement of the clusters produced by the corresponding analyses.
 in computational biology, it shows the clustering of genes or samples, sometimes in the margins of heatmaps.
 in phylogenetics, it displays the evolutionary relationships among various biological taxa. In this case, the dendrogram is also called a phylogenetic tree.

Clustering example 

For a clustering example, suppose that five taxa ( to ) have been clustered by UPGMA based on a matrix of genetic distances. The hierarchical clustering dendrogram would show a column of five nodes representing the initial data (here individual taxa), and the remaining nodes represent the clusters to which the data belong, with the arrows representing the distance (dissimilarity). The distance between merged clusters is monotone, increasing with the level of the merger: the height of each node in the plot is proportional to the value of the intergroup dissimilarity between its two daughters (the nodes on the right representing individual observations all plotted at zero height).

See also 
 Cladogram
 Distance matrices in phylogeny
 Hierarchical clustering
 MEGA, a freeware for drawing dendrograms
 yEd, a freeware for drawing and automatically arranging dendrograms
 Taxonomy

References

Citations

Sources

External links 
 Iris dendrogram - Example of using a dendrogram to visualize the 3 clusters from hierarchical clustering using the "complete" method vs the real species category (using R).

Trees (data structures)
Statistical charts and diagrams
Graph drawing
Cluster analysis